is a song by Japanese metal band Make-Up. Serving as the band's fourth major release single, "Pegasus Fantasy" and its B-side  were used as the theme songs for the first half of the original Saint Seiya anime. "Pegasus Fantasy" became Make-Up's most successful release, and they have re-released the song several times since its initial release in 1986. After releasing a "21st century ver." on their mini-album The Voice from Yesterday, Make-Up released a new edition of the song in 2012, subtitled "Version Omega", which features Shoko Nakagawa, the voice actress for Athena, on guest vocals and is used as the opening theme song for the re-imagined Saint Seiya Omega anime. "Pegasus Fantasy Version Omega" reached number 29 on the Oricon's weekly rankings. Masami Kurumada, the author of the Saint Seiya manga, has even included "Pegasus Fantasy" in the manga, with a background character seen singing it. It was appereanced in Taiko no Tatsujin: Drum 'n' Fun!.

Cover versions
"Pegasus Fantasy" has also been covered by many other subsequent artists and bands, including Animetal on their albums Animetal Marathon V and Decade of Bravehearts, Animetal USA on their debut self-titled album, Eizo Sakamoto on Eizo Japan 1, Takeshi Tsuruno on Tsuruno Uta, Sadie on V-Anime Rocks, Trick or Treat on Re-Animated, and even Italian power metal band Derdian, as a bonus track on the Japanese release of their album Limbo. Mary's Blood recorded a cover of the song for their 2020 cover album Re>Animator. Their vocalist Eye sings it as a duet with Make-Up's vocalist NoB, who has been her vocal coach for the last 10 years. The song has been translated into various languages for the localized dubs of the anime; the Brazilian Portuguese version of the song is noteworthy for having Edu Falaschi, former lead singer of power metal band Angra, covering the song. According to Faalschi himself, his version was originally a demo that was placed on-air without his knowledge which explains the "crummy" quality of the end product.

References

Anime songs
Saint Seiya
1986 songs
Columbia Records singles
Japanese hard rock songs